Rafael Nadal defeated Casper Ruud in the final, 6–3, 6–3, 6–0 to win the men's singles tennis title at the 2022 French Open. It was his record-extending 14th French Open title and record-extending 22nd major title overall. It marked the first time in his career that he won the Australian Open and the French Open in the same calendar year. Nadal also became the third man to defeat four top 10 players en route to a major title since the introduction of ATP rankings in 1973 (after Mats Wilander in the 1982 French Open and Roger Federer in the 2017 Australian Open). Ruud became the first Norwegian man to reach a major quarterfinal, semifinal, and final (surpassing his father Christian), and the first Scandinavian man to do so since Robin Söderling in 2010.

Novak Djokovic was the defending champion, but lost in the quarterfinals to Nadal. Djokovic was attempting to equal Nadal's all-time record of 21 men's singles major titles and become the first man in history to achieve the triple career Grand Slam. Their quarterfinal match was an Open Era record-extending 59th match between two male players.

Djokovic, Daniil Medvedev and Alexander Zverev were in contention for the ATP No. 1 singles ranking. Following Djokovic's quarterfinal loss and Zverev's semifinal retirement, Djokovic retained the No. 1 ranking at the end of the tournament. One week later, on 13 June 2022, when points from the previous year's tournament were dropped, Medvedev reclaimed the top ranking, while Zverev reached into the new career high ranking of world No. 2, ending the Big Three's streak in the top 2 spots since 10 November 2003. Additionally, as Roger Federer did not enter the tournament, he fell outside of the top 50 in the ATP rankings for the first time since 5 June 2000.

Stefanos Tsitsipas' fourth-round loss guaranteed a first-time French Open finalist from the bottom half of the draw, and Ruud became that finalist. Holger Rune became the first Danish man to reach a major singles quarterfinal in the Open Era.

This was the first edition of the French Open to feature a tiebreak (10-point) in the fifth set when the match reached 6 games all. Camilo Ugo Carabelli and Aslan Karatsev became the first players to contest this tiebreak in the main draw in their first-round match. This tournament marked the first time since the 2002 Australian Open that Feliciano López failed to qualify for the main draw of a major, ending his record streak of 79 consecutive major appearances. It was also the final professional tournament for former world No. 5 and 2008 Australian Open runner-up Jo-Wilfried Tsonga, who lost in the first round to Ruud.

Seeds

Draw

Finals

Top half

Section 1

Section 2

Section 3

Section 4

Bottom half

Section 5

Section 6

Section 7

Section 8

Seeded players 
The following are the seeded players. Seedings are based on ATP rankings as of 16 May 2022. Rankings and points before are as of 23 May 2022.

Because the 2022 tournament takes place one week earlier than in 2021, points from the 2020 and 2021 tournaments will not be dropped until 13 June 2022, one week after the end of the 2022 tournament. Those points are accordingly not reflected in the table below. Instead of points from the 2020 and 2021 tournaments, players will be dropping either (a) points from tournaments held during the week of 24 May 2021 (Belgrade 2 and Parma) or (b) their 19th best result.

Note that this is a different rankings adjustment system than the one that the WTA is using for the women's tournament.

† This column shows either (a) the player's points from tournaments held during the week of 24 May 2021 (Belgrade 2 and Parma) or (b) his 19th best result (in brackets). Points from the 2020 and 2021 French Open will not be dropped until 13 June 2022, one week after the end of the 2022 tournament, and are accordingly not shown in this table.

Withdrawn players 
The following players would have been seeded, but withdrew before the tournament began.

Other entry information

Wild cards 

Sources:

Protected ranking

Qualifiers

Lucky losers

Withdrawals 

 – not included on entry list& – withdrew from entry list
Rank date: 11 April 2022
Sources:

Explanatory notes

References

External links 
 Main draw
 French Open 2022
 (ATP) tournament profile

Men's Singles
French Open - Men's Singles
2022